Héctor Said Martínez Sorto (born 7 August 1991) is a Honduran  football referee who is a listed international referee for FIFA since 2017. He is also one of the referees for the Liga Nacional de Fútbol de Honduras.

Biography
Said Martínez was born in Tocoa on 7 August 1991. At the age of ten, he began the dream of being a referee with the example of his father, and made the decision in becoming a referee. With dedication and determination, he was the youngest to make his debut in football matches in the Liga Nacional de Fútbol Profesional de Honduras at just 18 years of age.

With many hopes in his professional life, he decided to move to Tegucigalpa due to the lack of opportunities in Tocoa. He entered the Francisco Morazán National Pedagogical University, where in a few years he would become a professional in mathematics, which makes this promise of refereeing one of the most prepared in this career.

Refereeing career
Martínez became an international referee for FIFA and CONCACAF in 2017. He had officiated at the 2019 CONCACAF Gold Cup in the United States, Costa Rica and Jamaica, the CONCACAF U-20 Championship, and the 2019 FIFA U-20 World Cup in Poland.

Martínez had recently officiated the 2021 CONCACAF Gold Cup, and had officiated the final between the United States and Mexico.

References

1991 births
Living people
Honduran football referees
People from Colón Department (Honduras)
CONCACAF Champions League referees
CONCACAF Gold Cup referees
2022 FIFA World Cup referees